The National Film Awards are presented every year by Directorate of Film Festivals, the organization set up by Ministry of Information and Broadcasting, India, to felicitate the best of Indian Cinema for the year. Throughout the year various awards have been discontinued and given intermittently. Following is the list of discontinued and intermittent National Film Awards. The awards, instituted 1953, on the 40th anniversary of Indian Cinema, are given for feature films, non-feature films and best writing on cinema, and were once officially known as the State Awards for Films. In addition to the regular National Film Awards, several discontinued and Intermittent National Film Awards have been presented throughout the years.

Discontinued National Film Awards 

Following were the National Film Awards discontinued over the years:

Feature films 

Following are the discontinued National Film Awards from feature films category:

All India Certificate of Merit 

The All India Certificate of Merit was one of the National Film Awards given by Ministry of Information and Broadcasting and Directorate of Film Festivals, India. It was instituted in 1954 and awarded at 1st National Film Awards and was lastly awarded in 1957 at 4th National Film Awards. It was given along with National Film Award for Best Feature Film and two films per year were awarded with this award.

Second Best Feature Film 

The award for National Film Award for Second Best Feature Film was instituted in 1957, at the 5th National Film Awards. It was awarded annually to a film produced in India that year, in any Indian language. It was last awarded in 1992, at the 40th National Film Awards.

Third Best Feature Film 

The National Film Award for Third Best Feature Film was one of the National Film Awards given by Ministry of Information and Broadcasting and Directorate of Film Festivals, India. It was instituted in 1958 and awarded at 6th National Film Awards and lastly awarded in 1965 at 13th National Film Awards and discontinued after that.

Best Story 

The National Film Award for Best Story was one of the National Film Awards given by Ministry of Information and Broadcasting and Directorate of Film Festivals, India. It was instituted in 1962 and awarded at 10th National Film Awards and lastly awarded in 1975 at 23rd National Film Awards and discontinued after that.

In the first year, for the 10th National Film Awards, award winners were awarded only with Certificate of Merit. Later on, all the award winners were awarded with Silver Lotus and cash prize of  10,000/-.

Best Film Based On High Literary Work 

The National Film Award for Best Film Based On High Literary Work was one of the National Film Awards given by Ministry of Information and Broadcasting and Directorate of Film Festivals, India. It was instituted in 1966 and awarded only at 14th National Film Awards.

Non-Feature Films 

Following are the discontinued National Film Awards from non-feature films category:

Best Experimental Film 

The National Film Award for Best Experimental Film was one of the National Film Awards given by Ministry of Information and Broadcasting and Directorate of Film Festivals, India. It was instituted in 1966 and awarded at 14th National Film Awards and lastly awarded in 1983 at 31st National Film Awards and discontinued after that.

Best Filmstrip 

The National Film Award for Best Filmstrip was one of the National Film Awards given by Ministry of Information and Broadcasting and Directorate of Film Festivals, India. It was instituted in 1963 and awarded only at 11th National Film Awards.

Best Industrial Film 

The National Film Award for Best Industrial Film was one of the National Film Awards given by Ministry of Information and Broadcasting and Directorate of Film Festivals, India. It was instituted in 1984 and awarded at 32nd National Film Awards and lastly awarded in 1988 at 36th National Film Awards and discontinued after that.

Best News Review 

The National Film Award for Best News Review was one of the National Film Awards given by Ministry of Information and Broadcasting and Directorate of Film Festivals, India. It was instituted in 1975 and awarded at 23rd National Film Awards and lastly awarded in 1988 at 36th National Film Awards and discontinued after that.

Best Newsreel Cameraman 

The National Film Award for Best Newsreel Cameraman was one of the National Film Awards given by Ministry of Information and Broadcasting and Directorate of Film Festivals, India. It was instituted in 1975 and awarded at 23rd National Film Awards and lastly awarded in 1983 at 31st National Film Awards and discontinued after that.

Intermittent National Film Awards 

Following are the National Film Awards given intermittently over the years:

Feature films

Best Feature Film in VIIIth Schedule Languages

Best Feature Film in Bodo 

The National Film Award for Best Feature Film in Bodo is one of the National Film Awards given by Ministry of Information and Broadcasting and Directorate of Film Festivals, India. Till now, it is only awarded twice: once at 33rd National Film Awards in 1985, and lately at 63rd National Film Awards in 2015.  Per Constitution of India, Bodo language is among the languages other than those specified in the Schedule VIII of the Constitution.

Best Feature Film in Dogri 

The National Film Award for Best Feature Film in Dogri is one of the National Film Awards given by Ministry of Information and Broadcasting and Directorate of Film Festivals, India for Dogri cinema. Till now, it is only awarded at 59th National Film Awards in 2011. Per Constitution of India, Dogri language is among the languages specified in the Schedule VIII of the Constitution.

Best Feature Film in Gujarati 

The National Film Award for Best Feature Film in Gujarati is one of the National Film Awards given by Ministry of Information and Broadcasting and Directorate of Film Festivals, India. It was instituted in 1960 and awarded at 8th National Film Awards and lately awarded at 60th National Film Awards in 2012, 64th National Film Awards in 2016 Per Constitution of India, Gujarati language is among the languages specified in the Schedule VIII of the Constitution.

Best Feature Film in Kashmiri 

The National Film Award for Best Feature Film in Kashmiri is one of the National Film Awards given by Ministry of Information and Broadcasting and Directorate of Film Festivals, India. Till now, it is only awarded at 12th National Film Awards in 1964. Per Constitution of India, Kashmiri language is among the languages specified in the Schedule VIII of the Constitution.

Best Feature Film in Konkani 

The National Film Award for Best Feature Film in Konkani is one of the National Film Awards given by Ministry of Information and Broadcasting and Directorate of Film Festivals, India. Konkani is among the languages specified in Schedule VIII of the Constitution of India. There was no separate category for Konkani at the 13th Awards, and Nirmon was awarded under the Marathi category.

Best Feature Film in Maithili 

The National Film Award for Best Feature Film in Maithili is one of the National Film Awards given by Ministry of Information and Broadcasting and Directorate of Film Festivals, India for Maithili cinema. Till now, it is only awarded at 63rd National Film Awards in 2015. Per Constitution of India, Sanskrit language is among the languages specified in the Schedule VIII of the Constitution.

Best Feature Film in Manipuri 
The National Film Award for Best Feature Film in Manipuri is one of the National Film Awards given by Ministry of Information and Broadcasting and Directorate of Film Festivals, India. It was instituted in 1972 and awarded at 20th National Film Awards and lately awarded at 67th National Film Awards in 2019. Per Constitution of India, Meitei language is among the languages specified in the Schedule VIII of the Constitution.

Best Feature Film in Punjabi 

The National Film Award for Best Feature Film in Punjabi is one of the National Film Awards given by Ministry of Information and Broadcasting and Directorate of Film Festivals, India. It was instituted in 1962 and awarded at 10th National Film Awards and lately awarded at 67th National Film Awards in 2019. Per Constitution of India, Punjabi language is among the languages specified in the Schedule VIII of the Constitution.

Best Feature Film in Sanskrit 

The National Film Award for Best Feature Film in Sanskrit is one of the National Film Awards given by Ministry of Information and Broadcasting and Directorate of Film Festivals, India for Sanskrit cinema. Till now, it is only awarded at 63rd National Film Awards in 2015. Per Constitution of India, Sanskrit language is among the languages specified in the Schedule VIII of the Constitution.

Best Feature Film in Urdu 

The National Film Award for Best Feature Film in Urdu is one of the National Film Awards given by Ministry of Information and Broadcasting and Directorate of Film Festivals, India. Till now, it is only awarded thrice at 41st National Film Awards in 1993, at 44th National Film Awards in 1996, and lately at 60th National Film Awards in 2012. Per Constitution of India, Urdu language is among the languages specified in the Schedule VIII of the Constitution.

Best Feature Film in non-VIIIth Schedule Languages

Best Feature Film in Bhojpuri 

The National Film Award for Best Feature Film in Bhojpuri is one of the National Film Awards given by Ministry of Information and Broadcasting and Directorate of Film Festivals, India. Till now, it is only awarded at 53rd National Film Awards in 2005. Per Constitution of India, Bhojpuri language is among the languages other than those specified in the Schedule VIII of the Constitution.

Best Feature Film in Garo 

The National Film Award for Best Feature Film in Garo is one of the National Film Awards given by Ministry of Information and Broadcasting and Directorate of Film Festivals, India. Till now, it is only awarded at 66th National Film Awards in 2018. Per Constitution of India, Garo language is among the languages other than those specified in the Schedule VIII of the Constitution.

Best Feature Film in Haryanvi 

The National Film Award for Best Feature Film in Haryanvi is one of the National Film Awards given by Ministry of Information and Broadcasting and Directorate of Film Festivals, India. Till now, it is only awarded thrice at 62nd (2014) and 63rd National Film Awards (2015) and 67th National Film Awards (2019). Per Constitution of India, Haryanvi language is among the languages other than those specified in the Schedule VIII of the Constitution.

Best Feature Film in Jasari 

The National Film Award for Best Feature Film in Jasari is one of the National Film Awards given by Ministry of Information and Broadcasting and Directorate of Film Festivals, India. Till now, it is only awarded at 65th National Film Awards in 2017. Per Constitution of India, Jasari language is among the languages other than those specified in the Schedule VIII of the Constitution.

Best Feature Film in Khasi 
The National Film Award for Best Feature Film in Khasi is one of the National Film Awards given by Ministry of Information and Broadcasting and Directorate of Film Festivals, India. Till now, it is only awarded four times at 32nd National Film Awards in 1984, at 61st National Film Awards in 2013, 63rd National Film Awards in 2015 and lately at 67th National Film Awards in 2019. Per Constitution of India, Khasi language is among the languages other than those specified in the Schedule VIII of the Constitution.

Best Feature Film in Kodava 

The National Film Award for Best Feature Film in Kodava is one of the National Film Awards given by Ministry of Information and Broadcasting and Directorate of Film Festivals, India. Till now, it is only awarded at 41st National Film Awards in 1993. Per Constitution of India, Kodava language is among the languages other than those specified in the Schedule VIII of the Constitution.

Best Feature Film in Kokborok 

The National Film Award for Best Feature Film in Kokborok is one of the National Film Awards given by Ministry of Information and Broadcasting and Directorate of Film Festivals, India. Till now, it is only awarded at 56th National Film Awards in 2008. Per Constitution of India, Kokborok language is among the languages other than those specified in the Schedule VIII of the Constitution.

Best Feature Film in Ladakhi 

The National Film Award for Best Feature Film in Ladakhi is one of the National Film Awards given by Ministry of Information and Broadcasting and Directorate of Film Festivals, India. Till now, it is only awarded at 65th National Film Awards in 2017. Per Constitution of India, Ladakhi language is among the languages other than those specified in the Schedule VIII of the Constitution.

Best Feature Film in Mishing 

The National Film Award for Best Feature Film in Mishing is one of the National Film Awards given by Ministry of Information and Broadcasting and Directorate of Film Festivals, India. Till now, it is awarded at 60th and 67th National Film Awards in 2012 and 2019 respectively. Per Constitution of India, Mishing language is among the languages other than those specified in the Schedule VIII of the Constitution.

Best Feature Film in Mizo 

The National Film Award for Best Feature Film in Mizo is one of the National Film Awards given by Ministry of Information and Broadcasting and Directorate of Film Festivals, India for Sanskrit cinema. Till now, it is only awarded at 63rd National Film Awards in 2015. Per Constitution of India, Mizo language is among the languages other than those specified in the Schedule VIII of the Constitution.

Best Feature Film in Monpa 

The National Film Award for Best Feature Film in Monpa is one of the National Film Awards given by Ministry of Information and Broadcasting and Directorate of Film Festivals, India. Till now, it is only awarded at 53rd National Film Awards in 2005. Per Constitution of India, Monpa language is among the languages other than those specified in the Schedule VIII of the Constitution.

Best Feature Film in Pangchenpa 
The National Film Award for Best Feature Film in Pangchenpa is one of the National Film Awards given by Ministry of Information and Broadcasting and Directorate of Film Festivals, India. Till now, it is only awarded at 66th National Film Awards in 2018. Per Constitution of India, Pangchenpa language is among the languages other than those specified in the Schedule VIII of the Constitution.

Best Feature Film in Rabha 

The National Film Award for Best Feature Film in Rabha is one of the National Film Awards given by Ministry of Information and Broadcasting and Directorate of Film Festivals, India. Till now, it is only awarded at 62nd National Film Awards in 2014. Per Constitution of India, Rabha language is among the languages other than those specified in the Schedule VIII of the Constitution.

Best Feature Film in Sherdukpen 

The National Film Award for Best Feature Film in Sherdukpen is one of the National Film Awards given by Ministry of Information and Broadcasting and Directorate of Film Festivals, India. Till now, it is awarded twice at 61st National Film Awards in 2013 and 66th National Film Awards in 2018. Per Constitution of India, Sherdukpen language is among the languages other than those specified in the Schedule VIII of the Constitution.

Best Feature Film in Tulu 

The National Film Award for Best Feature Film in Tulu is one of the National Film Awards given by Ministry of Information and Broadcasting and Directorate of Film Festivals, India. Till now, it is awarded six times. Per Constitution of India, Tulu language is among the languages other than those specified in the Schedule VIII of the Constitution.

Best Feature Film in Wancho 

The National Film Award for Best Feature Film in Wancho is one of the National Film Awards given by Ministry of Information and Broadcasting and Directorate of Film Festivals, India for Sanskrit cinema. Till now, it is only awarded at 63rd National Film Awards in 2015. Per Constitution of India, Wancho language is among the languages other than those specified in the Schedule VIII of the Constitution.

Best Writing on Cinema

Special Jury Award / Special Mention (Book on Cinema) 

The National Film Award – Special Jury Award / Special Mention (Book on Cinema) is one of the National Film Awards given by Directorate of Film Festivals, India. It is instituted in 2000 and awarded at 48th National Film Awards.

The award aims at encouraging study and appreciation of cinema as an art form and dissemination of information and critical appreciation of this art-form through publication of books, articles, reviews etc. All the award winners are awarded with a Certificate of Merit.

References

External links 

Official websites
 Official page for Directorate of Film Festivals of India
 National Film Awards Archives

National Film Awards (India)
National Film Awards